This is a list of colleges in Anantnag, Jammu and Kashmir.

Medical College
 Government Medical College, Anantnag.

Degree colleges and B.Ed colleges
 Government College for Women, Anantnag.
 Government Degree College, Uttersoo.
 Government Degree College for Boys, Anantnag
 Government Degree College, Bijbehara.
 Government Degree College, Larnoo
 Government Degree College, Kokernag
 Government Degree College, Doru

References

Anantnag
colleges in Anantnag